The mundu is a garment worn around the waist in the Indian states of Kerala, Tamil Nadu, the Lakshadweep archipelago, and the Indian Ocean island nation of Maldives. It is closely related to sarongs like dhotis and lungis.  It is normally woven in cotton and coloured white or cream. The colour is dependent on whether the cotton is bleached or unbleached. A  is made using handlooms. When unbleached, the mundu is called . In modern times, two types of mundu are prevalent—the single and the double. A single mundu is wrapped only once around the waist, while the double one is folded in half before wearing. A mundu is usually starched before use.

Men
A mundu usually has a line of comparatively thicker cloth woven into it near the border called the kara. The kara can be coloured and comes in various sizes. There is also double coloured and ornamental kara (a strip of colour at the end of the mundu). For more ceremonial occasions (like weddings), a mundu has a golden embroidery known as kasavu. The wearer highlights the 'kara' by carefully folding the end of the mundu. The kara generally appears on the right-hand side of the person, though styles with the kara on the left side are prevalent.
Unspoken rules of etiquette govern the way the mundu is worn. Men will often fold the garment in half to resemble a short skirt when working, cycling, etc. When faced with such a social situation, the fold of the mundu is loosened with an imperceptible flick and it flutters down to cover the legs completely.  Sometimes a belt will be used; a popular Velcro belt that comes in either green or black has yellow pockets to keep valuables and hold the mundu (or lungi) secure.

Despite the considerable influence of western dressing forms in South Indian culture, Hindu traditional ceremonies of Kerala (some Hindu castes in other south Indian states) it is mandatory for the men to wear the Mundu. For Hindu weddings, men have to wear Mundu along with either shirt or a mel mundu. 
It is also considered appropriate for men to wear Mundu during their visits to the temples and attending religious functions, though it is not mandatory at all places. However, it is a mandatory requirement to wear mundu and mel mundu for men to visit some famous temples in Kerala like the Guruvayur Temple, the Padmanabhaswamy Temple) etc. For the convenience of devotees, temple managements may provide these on rent in the temple premises.

Women
A variant called a mundum neriyatum is used more often by women. The mundum neriyatum is a set of two mundus, both having matching kara. The set contains a lower garment similar to those worn by men. The upper mundu, worn with a blouse, is wrapped once around the waist and upper body and left hanging from the left shoulder, resembling a sari. This is often called a set-mundu. This is usually worn during festivals or special occasions.

A veshti is a small piece of cloth (generally put on the shoulders) along with a mundu, which is worn in Kerala amongst Malayalis for formal occasions.

Kerala Lungi
Labourers prefer to wear lungis while working. Most men in Kerala use lungi as casual wear or as a house dress, as it is quite comfortable to wear. Lungis are generally colourful, and with varying designs. They are not worn during occasions such as weddings or other religious ceremonies. Saffron-coloured lungis are also commonly worn by men.

See also
 Lungi
 Mundum neriyatum
 Sarong
 Toga

References

 South India By Richard Plunkettx. 
 Female Ascetics: Hierarchy and Purity in an Indian Religious Movement By Wendy Sinclair-Brull page number 170. 
 The Syrian Christians of Kerala By S. G. Pothan.

Indian clothing
Skirts
Culture of Karnataka